Mount Besar (means: Big Mountain) is a stratovolcano in the southeast of Sumatra, Indonesia. A minor sulfur deposit can be found in the crater. A big solfatara field called Marga Bayur is located along its north-south-west flanks or the Semangko fault system.

See also 

 List of volcanoes in Indonesia

References 

Besar
Besar
Besar
Besar
Pleistocene stratovolcanoes